Lois Katrine Pitman,  ( 1919 – 30 October 2014) was an Australian military officer and social worker. She served as director of the Women's Royal Australian Air Force (WRAAF) from 1960 to 1972.

Born in Melbourne, Pitman joined the Women's Auxiliary Australian Air Force in 1942 and later served with the Department of Post-War Reconstruction. She qualified as a social worker and worked with the Heidelberg Repatriation Hospital and the St Thomas' Hospital. After joining the WRAAF she studied psychology at Australian National University.

Pitman was appointed an Officer of the Order of the British Empire in 1968.

References

External links
 National Library of Australia

1910s births
2014 deaths
20th-century Australian public servants
Australian National University alumni
Australian military personnel of World War II
Australian Officers of the Order of the British Empire
Australian social workers
Australian women in World War II
Military personnel from Melbourne
University of Melbourne alumni
Women in the Australian military